Spirou Charleroi, commonly known simply as Spirou, is a Belgian professional basketball club that is located in Charleroi. The club competes in the BNXT League, the highest tier of basketball in Belgium. The club's home arena is the Spiroudome which can host 6,300 people.

Established in 1989, the team is named after the long-running Belgian comics magazine Spirou.

History
Spirou Charleroi has won the Belgian League championship ten times (1996–99, 2003, 2004, 2008, 2009, 2010, 2011), the Belgian Cup 5 times (1996, 1999, 2002, 2003, 2009), and the Belgian Supercup 7 times (1996, 1997, 1999, 2001, 2002, 2008, 2010).

In the 2010–11 season, Spirou made its debut in the Euroleague, the highest continental league of Europe. The following season, Spirou played in the regular season for the second time in a row.

On July 29, 2014, Jacques Stas became the new head coach of the club while his predecessor Giovanni Bozzi replaced him as team president.

Since the 2021–22 season, Spirou plays in the BNXT League, in which the national leagues of Belgium and the Netherlands have been merged.

Sponsorship names

Partly due to sponsorship reasons, the club has known several names:
Spirou Monceau (1989–1990)
Spirou Charleroi (1990–2011)
Belgacom Spirou (2011–2014)
Proximus Spirou (2014–2018)

Current roster

Honours
Belgian League
Champions (10): 1995–96, 1996–97, 1997–98, 1998–99, 2002–03, 2003–04, 2007–08, 2008–09, 2009–10, 2010–11
Runners-up (2): 2004–05, 2011–12
Belgian Cup
Winners (5): 1995–96, 1998–99, 2001–02, 2002–03, 2008–09
Belgian Supercup
Winners (7): 1996, 1997, 1999, 2001, 2002, 2008, 2010
Charleroi, Belgium Invitational Game
Winners (1): 2008

Season by season

Notable players

References

External links 

  
Eurocup – Team profile
Eurobasket.com – Team page

Basketball teams in Belgium
Sport in Charleroi
Basketball teams established in 1989
Dupuis
Pro Basketball League